Joël Armel Tchami Ngalaha (born 25 March 1982) is a Cameroonian former professional footballer who played as a striker.

Career
Tchami was born in Bafang. He previously played for Stade Lavallois in France's Ligue 2.

In January he joined Danish Superliga club AC Horsens from Israeli side Hapoel Kfar Saba after trialling with the club. He signed a one-and-a-half-year contract.

Personal life
Tchami is from a family of footballers. One of his older brothers is Alphonse Tchami, former Cameroon international, another is Bertrand, a former Grenoble Foot 38 and Stade de Reims player, and Joël's younger brother, Hervé Tchami, is also a footballer.

References

External links
 
 

1982 births
Living people
Cameroonian footballers
Association football forwards
Bundesliga players
Ligue 2 players
Danish Superliga players
V.League 1 players
Slovak Super Liga players
Nemzeti Bajnokság I players
Hertha BSC players
Hertha BSC II players
Stade Lavallois players
Hapoel Kfar Saba F.C. players
AC Horsens players
Pegah Gilan players
Al Ansar FC players
FC UTA Arad players
Al Salmiya SC players
Hà Nội FC (1956) players
FC DAC 1904 Dunajská Streda players
Egri FC players
Cameroonian expatriate footballers
Cameroonian expatriate sportspeople in Germany
Expatriate footballers in Germany
Cameroonian expatriate sportspeople in France
Expatriate footballers in France
Cameroonian expatriate sportspeople in Israel
Expatriate footballers in Israel
Cameroonian expatriate sportspeople in Denmark
Expatriate men's footballers in Denmark
Cameroonian expatriate sportspeople in Iran
Expatriate footballers in Iran
Cameroonian expatriate sportspeople in Lebanon
Expatriate footballers in Lebanon
Cameroonian expatriate sportspeople in Romania
Expatriate footballers in Romania
Cameroonian expatriate sportspeople in Kuwait
Expatriate footballers in Kuwait
Cameroonian expatriate sportspeople in Vietnam
Expatriate footballers in Vietnam
Cameroonian expatriate sportspeople in Slovakia
Expatriate footballers in Slovakia
Cameroonian expatriate sportspeople in Hungary
Expatriate footballers in Hungary
Cameroonian expatriate sportspeople in Malaysia
Expatriate footballers in Malaysia